Madison-Grant United School Corporation (MGUSC) is a school district headquartered in unincorporated Grant County, Indiana, near Fairmount. The district serves sections of Grant and Madison counties.

In Grant County it serves Fairmount, Fowlerton, and Point Isabel, and in Madison County it serves Summitville.

Schools

 Madison-Grant High School (unincorporated Grant County)
 Madison-Grant Junior High (unincorporated Grant County)
 Park Elementary School (Fairmount)
 Summitville Elementary School (Summitville)

References

External links

Education in Madison County, Indiana
Education in Grant County, Indiana
School districts in Indiana